President of the Chamber of Deputies may refer to:
 List of presidents of the Argentine Chamber of Deputies
 List of presidents of the Chamber of Deputies of Bolivia
 President of the Chamber of Deputies (Brazil)
 President of the Chamber of Deputies of Chile
 President of the Chamber of Deputies (Czech Republic)
 President of the Chamber of Deputies of the Dominican Republic
 President of the Chamber of Deputies (Italy)
 List of presidents of the Chamber of Deputies of Luxembourg
 President of the Chamber of Deputies Directive Board, Mexico
 President of the Chamber of Deputies of Romania
 List of presidents of the Chamber of Deputies of Rwanda
 President of the Chamber of Deputies of Tunisia
 List of presidents of the Chamber of Deputies of Uruguay

See also
 Chamber of Deputies
 :Category:Chairs of lower houses